Tema Mursadat (born March 7, 1978) is an Indonesian former footballer who best-known played for Persib Bandung as goalkeeper.

References

1978 births
Association football goalkeepers
Living people
Indonesian footballers
Indonesian Premier Division players
Persita Tangerang players
Persib Bandung players
Persikabo Bogor players
Liga 1 (Indonesia) players
Pelita Bandung Raya players